The 2016–17 UT Martin Skyhawks men's basketball team represented the University of Tennessee at Martin during the 2016–17 NCAA Division I men's basketball season. The Skyhawks, led by first-year head coach Anthony Stewart, played their home games at Skyhawk Arena as members of the West Division of the Ohio Valley Conference. They finished the season 22–13, 10–6 in OVC play to win the West Division championship. As the No. 2 seed in the OVC tournament, they defeated Murray State before losing to Jacksonville State in the championship game. They were invited to the CollegeInsider.com Tournament where they defeated UNC Asheville in the first round before losing in the second round to Campbell.

Previous season 
The Skyhawks finished the 2015–16 season 20–15, 10–6 in OVC play to share the West Division championship with Murray State. They defeated Morehead State to advance to the championship game of the OVC tournament where they lost to Austin Peay. They were invited to the CollegeInsider.com Tournament where they defeated Central Michigan in the first round before losing in the second round to Ball State.

Following the season, head coach Heath Schroyer left UT Martin to become an assistant at NC State. Anthony Stewart was named interim head coach and had the interim tag removed in November 2016.

Preseason 
In a vote of Ohio Valley Conference head men’s basketball coaches and sports information directors, UT Martin was picked to finish fourth in the West Division of the OVC.

Roster

Schedule and results

|-
!colspan=9 style=| Exhibition

|-
!colspan=9 style=| Non–conference regular season

|-
!colspan=9 style=| Ohio Valley Conference regular season

|-
!colspan=9 style=| Ohio Valley Conference tournament

|-
!colspan=9 style=| CIT

References

UT Martin Skyhawks men's basketball seasons
Tennessee-Martin
UT Martin